Ondine (Q121) was a French Navy  commissioned in 1928. She was sunk in a collision in October 1928.

Construction and commissioning

Ordered on 30 June 1922, Ondine was laid down alog with her sister ship  at Chantiers et Ateliers Augustin Normand in Le Havre, France, on 8 February 1923 with the hull number Q121. She was launched on either 8 May or 5 August 1925, according to different sources, and commissioned on 17 August 1928.

Service history

Ondine departed Cherbourg, France, on 1 October 1928 for a lengthy cruise to Bizerte and Tunis in Tunisia, Ajaccio in Corsica, and Toulon, France. She was never heard from again.

By 11 October 1928, the French Navy had determined that Ondine had not reached any port in Spain, Portugal, or the Canary Islands.

The French Navy subsequently received word that the Greek cargo ship  had entered drydock at Rotterdam in the Netherlands for repairs, reporting that she had struck a low-lying vessel in the Atlantic Ocean off Vigo, Spain, at 23:00 on 3 October 1928.

References

Citations

Bibliography
 .
 .
 .

External links

 
 
 
 .

Ariane-class submarines
1925 ships
Ships built in France
Submarines of France
Maritime incidents in 1928
French submarine accidents
Shipwrecks in the Atlantic Ocean
Submarines sunk in collisions
Warships lost with all hands
Lost submarines of France